The Crime Doctor's Gamble is a 1947 American mystery film directed by William Castle and starring Warner Baxter, Micheline Cheirel and Roger Dann. It is part of the Crime Doctor series of films made by Columbia Pictures.

Plot

While in Paris, Doctor Robert Ordway assists the local police to investigate a murder.

Cast

 Warner Baxter as Dr. Robert Ordway  
 Micheline Cheirel as Mignon Duval Jardin  
 Roger Dann as Henri Jardin  
 Steven Geray as Jules Daudet  
 Marcel Journet as Inspector Jacques Morrell  
 Eduardo Ciannelli as Maurice Duval  
 Maurice Marsac as Anton Geroux  
 Henri Letondal as Louis Chabonet  
 Jean Del Val as Theodore - Butler  
 Leonardo Scavino as Brevoir - Auctioneer  
 Wheaton Chambers as Brown  
 Emory Parnell as O'Reilly  
 George Davis as Paul Romaine  
 Frank Arnold as Buyer  
 Paul Bradley as Lecture Guest 
 Peter Camlin as Wagon Driver  
 Jack Chefe as Jacques, Waiter 
 Marcel De la Brosse as Buyer  
 Bernard DeRoux as Coroner  
 Dolores Graham as Apache Dancer  
 Don Graham as Apache Dancer 
 Anton Kosta as Jauvet  
 Max Linder as Lecture Guest  
 Alphonse Martell as Institute Superintendent  
 Nanette Vallon as Charwoman  
 Robert Verdaine as Detective  
 Jacques Villon as Clerk

References

Bibliography
 Erickson, Hal. From Radio to the Big Screen: Hollywood Films Featuring Broadcast Personalities and Programs. McFarland, 2014.

External links
 
 
 
 

1947 films
1947 mystery films
1940s English-language films
American mystery films
Films directed by William Castle
Columbia Pictures films
American black-and-white films
Films set in Paris
Crime Doctor (character) films
1940s American films